Muvattupuzha is a town, muncipality and taluk in the midlands directly to the east of Kochi in Ernakulam district, Kerala, India. The town is also the starting point of the Muvattupuzhayar (Muvattupuzha river), which is a confluence formed by three rivers: the Thodupuzhayar, Kaliyar, and Kothayar.

Muvattupuzha is bordered by the Kottayam district on the southern side and the Idukki district on the eastern side. It is the second biggest commercial center of the district and one of the biggest in the central part of the state. There are two major malls: Canton Mall & Grand Central Mall.

Etymology

The town is named after the Muvattupuzha river that flows through it. The name is made up of three Malayalam words: Moonnu, aaru; and puzha. Aaru is usually used for rivers in the southern half of Kerala, while puzha is used in the northern parts. The three rivers are Kothayaar, Kaliyar, and Thodupuzhayar, which merge to form Muvattupuzhayar. The meeting point is called Thriveni Sangamam in Malayalam, which means "the point of confluence of three rivers".

In English both spellings (Muvattupuzha and Moovattupuzha) are used interchangeably.

History
Muvattupuzha was part of the Vadakkumkoor Kingdom until it was seized by the Travancore. Old documents show that parts of the lands of Muvattupuzha belonged to Edappally Swaroopam, but were later transferred to Manas' (Brahmin families).

After Indian independence, from 1949 to 1956, Muvattupuzha was a part of the Kottayam district in Travancore-Cochin state. In 1956, when Kerala state was formed, Muvattupuzha remained as a part of Kottayam district until 1958, when Ernakulam district was formed on 1 April 1958. Muvattupuzha, as a village union, came under the control of a council of three members nominated by the Government. V. P. Govindan Nair was the first president of the village union. By 1953, Muvattupuzha was declared a panchayat. Kunnappillil Varkey Vaidyan was the first president of the elected panchayat committee. Muvattupuzha was raised to the status of a municipality in the year 1958. N. Parameshwaran Nair became the first municipal chairman. Muvattupuzha is the first municipality where the Communist Party came into power in a general election.

N. P. Varghese was the first elected Member of the Legislative Assembly (MLA) from Muvattupuzha Assembly Constituency, who defeated Manjunatha Prabhu of the Communist Party. Later, K. M. George, founder of Kerala Congress, represented Muvattupuzha. The first member of parliament (MP) of Muvattupuzha (as a Lok Sabha constituency) was George Thomas Kottukapally. The first block panchayat president of Muvattupuzha was Shyson P Manguzha in 1995 from the Arakuzha block panchayat division.

St. Thomas, the apostle who introduced Christianity to India, is believed to have visited this region. The Marth Mariam Syro-Malabar Catholic Church of Arakuzha has a recorded history of over 1,000 years, making it one of the oldest Syrian churches in Kerala. It is known for its paintings and sculptures. Muvattupuzha was also known as Arakuzha Pakuthi (meaning half of Arakuzha).

Demographics
As of 2011 Census, Muvattupuzha had a population of 30,397, of which 15,010 were males and 15,387 females.

The sub-population of children aged 0–6 was 2,945, which was 9.69% of total population of Muvattupuzha.

The literacy rate in Muvattupuzha town was 96.11%, higher than the state average of 94.00%. In Muvattupuzha, male literacy was around 97.20% while female literacy rate was 95.07%.

Religion

The region has Hindus, Syrian Christians, and Muslims.

Kavumpady Road in the town center contains major agraharam of Kerala Iyers. Konkanis are also present in fewer numbers. Hindus are the majority in the region with castes like Nair, Ezhava, Namboodiri, and Pulayar present around the taluka.

Syrian Christians include a majority of Syro-Malabar Catholics and Jacobites. There are Orthodox, Syro-Malankara Catholics, Marthomites and Pentecostal. Muvattupuzha is the seat of the Muvattupuzha diocese of Malankara Jacobite Syrian Orthodox Church and the Kandanad East diocese. There is a small Latin Catholic community also in Muvattupuzha whose church was established in 1925, situated in Vazhappilly.

Mappila Muslims comprise most of the Muslim population.
The Kothamangalam-Muvattupuzha region is an important center for Mappila Muslims. Perumattam Juma Masjid, the first mosque in the eastern part of the district, is located in Muvattupuzha Taluk. Thottathikulam, Chakungal, Panakkal and Cherukappilly are the four traditional Muslim families who founded the centuries-old Perumattam Masjid.

Geography 
The town and western parts of the region are mainly plains and is culturally similar to Ernakulam, whereas the eastern parts are mainly highlands. The regions of Thodupuzha, Muvattupuzha, and Kothamangalam are called sub-high ranges or keezhmalanad of Vadakkumkoor Kingdom, indicating they were lands with fertile soil deposited by the Thodupuzha and Muvattupuzha rivers from flooding. Muvattupuzha and nearby areas are less hilly and fertile. The altitude is lower and the hilly region is the Kadalikkad-Meenkunnam-Pampakkuda curved region.

The term sub-high ranges or "low ranges" is a term used to describe the towns of Thodupuzha and Palai. The low-range towns lying in the foothills of western ghats along the SH 8 (Punaloor-Muvattupuzha road) meet the main interjunction at Muvattupuzha. Nine major roads converge here and connect to all directions.

Muvattupuzha river
The Muvattupuzha river starts in the Idukki highranges and flows through Muvattupuzha, running  before entering the Kottayam district. The major source of water is the Thodupuzha river which starts in the Idukki district and provides water throughout the year, enabled by the supply of water from Idukki arch dam, which is the largest arch dam in India, and is used for hydro-electric power generation.

Muvattupuzha Bridge
In 1914, the first concrete bridge in Asia was built in Muvattupuzha under the supervision of the British engineer W.H. Emrald. It is said that on its inauguration, to convince others of the strength and stability of the bridge, Emrald and his wife sat beneath the bridge in a boat while 15 elephants walked over it. This bridge connects Nehru Park and Kacherithazham.

There was a wooden bridge across the river through which the steam bus went from Muvattupuzha to Ernakulam. The border to Kochi state was at Chungam, Mamala, near Thiruvankulam. Until the late 1970s, traffic went over the old concrete bridge. There was a traffic police outpost on either side of the bridge to control one-way traffic. Later in the 1970s, a new bridge was constructed and in the late 1970s the traffic diverted through a wider two-way bridge.

Politics
Muvattupuzha is one of the 140 legislative assembly constituencies of Kerala state. Its assembly constituency is part of Idukki (Lok Sabha constituency) and the current MP is Dean Kuriakose of Indian National Congress. The major political parties of Muvattupuzha are Indian National Congress, Kerala Congress (M), CPI (M), CPI, Muslim League, and BJP. Mathew Kuzhalnadan of Indian National Congress is the current MLA of Muvattupuzha.

Administratively, Muvattupuzha is a municipality and the current municipal council is ruled by Indian National Congress, led by P P Eldose who was elected in 2020.

Political leaders of the past include K. M. George (former Minister and the founder of Kerala Congress) and P.P Esthose (former MP and MLA). The present political leaders of Kerala who are from Muvattupuzha are Mathew Kuzhalnadan, Johny Nelloor, Francis George (former MP), and Gopi Kottamurikkal (former MLA and Ernakulam district secretary of CPI(M)).

Notable people
 Madhu Neelakandan, award-winning Indian cinematographer
 K. M. George was a veteran politician and former minister. He was the founder of the Kerala Congress Party and former Muvattupuzha MLA. His son Francis George is former M. P. of Idukki.
 Johnny Nellore is a veteran politician and former MLA of Muvattupuzha from 1991 to 2006. He was the chairman of Kerala Congress (Jacob). Now he is in KC (M) Joseph Faction
 Francis George is a Kerala Congress leader and former MP of Idukki. He is the son of K. M. George.
 Jeethu Joseph, award-winning Indian film director and screenwriter
 Bhagath Manuel, Indian film actor
 Vishak Nair, Indian film actor
 Anoop Kannan, Indian film director & producer
 Kalabhavan Abi, Indian film actor 
 Shane Nigam, Indian film actor
 Mathew Kuzhalnadan, Indian MLA of Muvattupuzha

Places of worship

Educational organizations

 School of Architecture Mookambika Technical Campus, Eattappilly, Mannathur P.O
 Mookambika College of Pharmacy Eattappilly, Mannathur P.O
 Ilahia College of Engineering and Technology

Transport

KL-17 is the RTO code for Muvattupuzha taluka, including the town. Auto rickshaws are commonly used for small distances. Taxis are also available.

Muvattupuzha is well-connected to the main cities of the state via road. Muvattupuzha is in the center of the midlands region starting from the eastern borders of Kochi city at Kakkanad spreading all the way to Thodupuzha and Vannappuram. The town has very good accessibility through roads. Unfortunately, railways has not yet reached Muvattupuzha. But, Sabari railway will ensure railway connectivity.

Muvattupuzha is a major junction for highways passing through the town. There are nine highways and major roads which join at Muvattupuzha, which include:
 NH 85 (previously NH 49) Kochi–Dhanushkodi passing through Munnar.
 MC Road towards Angamaly connects the town towards northern part of the state such as Thrissur, Palakkad and Kozhikode
 MC Road towards Thiruvananthapuram passing through many important towns in Central Travancore like Kottayam, Changanassery.
 Punalur–Muvattupuzha PM road passing through low ranges (foothills of western ghats) towns like Thodupuzha, Pala, Ponkunnam
 Muvattupuzha–Vaikom–Alappuzha highway through Piravom, Peruva, Thalayolaparambu.
 Muvattupuzha–Theni SH 43 state highway passing through Chalikkadavu, Randattinkara, Kalloorkkad, Udumbannoor.
 Palarivattom–Thekkady SH 41 passing through Kakkanad, Pattimattom, Muvattupuzha, Pandappilly, Arikkuzha, Thodupuzha, Moolamattom, Vagamon
 Muvattupuzha–Kaliyar road passing through Kakkadassery, Pothanikkad, Paingottoor, Vannappuram

Economy
Muvattupuzha taluk consists of midlands and highlands with agriculture and small-scale industries as its primary economic base. Muvattupuzha was a part of the Travancore Kingdom. The border check posts of Travancore in Mamala, near Thiruvankulam prevented interconnectivity between Kochi and Muvattupuzha. Muvattupuzha was an important commercial centre and a prominent town until about 1975. The 2011 Census of India noted a new, separate, and distinct urban agglomeration including parts of the Muvattupuzha and Kothamangalam talukas.

Infrastructure
Muvattupuzha is between Angamaly and Kottayam on the Main Central Road, The first and second longest state highways of Kerala, Main Central Road (Angamaly - Thiruvananthapuram / SH-01 / ) and Main Eastern Highway (Muvattupuzha–Punalur / SH-08 / ), meet here. The Muvattupuzha–Theni Highway (SH 43) starts at the Chalikkadavu Bridge and goes through Randattinkara, Kotta, Udumbannoor, Kattappana, Nedumkandam and Cumbum before ending at Theni, which is a shorter route to Madurai in neighbouring Tamil Nadu.

A bypass to Thodupuzha Road and MC Road is planned from Kadathi on NH49 via the proposed new bridge at Murikkallu.

Suburbs 
Kizhakkekara and Randaattinkara (Randarkara or Randar) lies on the eastern part of the town on the banks of the Muvattupuzha river.

The old Muvattupuzha bridge built over the Muvattupuzha river was the first concrete bridge in Asia, and was completed in 1914. It serves as the connection between Nehru Park and Kacherithazham.

The nearby panchayaths mostly have agriculture and small- and medium-scale industries. Pineapple and rubber plantations are the common agrarian products. Match box industries, plywood factories, saw mills, paper, plastic and wood carton production are the main industries in this area.

See also
 Marady
 Anikkad
 Arakuzha
 Valayanchirangara
 Mulavoor
 Perumpalloor

References

Sources
Kerala PWD
Statehighways in Yahoo Maps
State Highway list

External links

Official Government page for Muvattupuzha in Malayalam
Map of Eurnakulam in Kerala
Airapuram Rubber Park Farmers Action Council
Remaining Date for Muvattupuzha Municipality Election 2020

 
Cities and towns in Ernakulam district